Lochmaben railway station was a station which served Lochmaben, in the Scottish county of Dumfries and Galloway.

History

The line was operated by the Caledonian from the outset, and in 1865 the DL&LJR was amalgamated into the Caledonian Railway by Act of Parliament. It was then used by the Caledonian as a strategic link to access Nithsdale and the Portpatrick line by running powers over the Glasgow and South Western Railway (GSWR).

In its early days Lochmaben station had a single platform on the south west side of the running line with a goods yard behind the platform. There was a goods warehouse, cattle pens and a crane. By 1899 the station was situated on a passing loop and there were two platforms either side of it.

The station building in the Scottish baronial style with crow steeped gables, along with a substantial stone goods shed.

By 1899 a road over bridge was built to replace the level crossing of the Beattock road north out of Lochmaben. Doubling of the line was proposed but never constructed.

In 1923 the line became part of the London Midland and Scottish Railway (LMS) following the Railways Grouping of 1923, since the LMS also took over the GSWR line to Dumfries via Annan the Dumfries to Lockerbie line lost its strategic importance, and a gradual decline set in.

Lochmaben lost its signal box in the 1930s as an economy measure and subsequently the loop line was lifted.

During the war years the station was served by elderly ex London and North western 2-4-2 tank engines working a push pull service between Lockerbie & Dumfries, then in the last few years the passenger trains were pulled by ex Caledonian locomotives, the last being ex CR"Jumbo"0-6-0 17504.

Goods facilities were retained at the station until the early 1960s, and a Scottish Region camping coach was situated at the end of the goods shed siding behind the platform from 1956 to 1961.

All goods traffic along the line ceased on 18 April 1966. Subsequently the whole site has been cleared, the B7020 road to Beattock realigned across the site of the station and housing built over most of the goods yard.

References

Notes

Citations

Bibliography

Further reading

External links
 Station on navigable O.S. map

Disused railway stations in Dumfries and Galloway
Former Caledonian Railway stations
Railway stations in Great Britain opened in 1863
Railway stations in Great Britain closed in 1952
Lochmaben